Rabindra Mahavidyalaya, (popularly known as Champadanga College) established in 1971, is a general degree college in Champadanga, in the Hooghly district, India. It offers undergraduate courses in arts, commerce and sciences. It is affiliated to University of Burdwan.

History 
The college named Rabindra Mahavidyalaya, officially started on and from 8 November 1971 after due affiliation of the University of Burdwan. Initially, only eight students were admitted to the pre-university course and twenty-five students to the B.Com Pass course. After that, in the academic session of 1972-1973, the B.A. course in the pre-university and degree level started. In the decade of the 1980s, a steady fund was allotted in the form of various aids. Gradually, the aids were granted to this institution by the State government as well as the University Grants Commission (UGC).

Departments

Science
 Chemistry 
 Physics 
 Botany
 Zoology
 Microbiology
 Statistics
 Mathematics

Arts and Commerce
 Bengali
 English
 Sanskrit
 History
 Geography
 Political Science
 Philosophy
 Education
 Economics
 Physical Education
 Defence Studies 
 Commerce

Accreditation
The college is recognized by the University Grants Commission (UGC). It was accredited by the National Assessment and Accreditation Council (NAAC), and awarded B++ grade, an accreditation that has since then expired.

See also

References

External links
 Rabindra Mahavidyalaya

Colleges affiliated to University of Burdwan
Educational institutions established in 1971
Universities and colleges in Hooghly district
Memorials to Rabindranath Tagore
1971 establishments in West Bengal